Rybnica may refer to:

Rybnica, Jelenia Góra County in Lower Silesian Voivodeship (south-west Poland)
Rybnica, Wrocław County in Lower Silesian Voivodeship (south-west Poland)
Rybnica, Lublin Voivodeship (east Poland)
Rybnica, Świętokrzyskie Voivodeship (south-central Poland)
Rybnica, West Pomeranian Voivodeship (north-west Poland)
Rîbnița, Moldova

See also
Ribnica (disambiguation)
Rîbnița